Line 1 of the Thessaloniki Metro, also known as the Base Project, is a deep-level underground rapid transit line in Thessaloniki, Greece, connecting  in the west with  in the east, before continuing on to the . The line was set to open in 2023. Discovery of historical sites in 2019 halted work for 28 months while excavations took place. Of the line's 13 stations, 11 are also stops for Thessaloniki Metro's Line 2, as they will share tunnels.

Construction costs for the line are set at €1.05 billion ($ billion), enough to classify it as a megaproject.

Stations

References

See also
Thessaloniki Metro
Thessaloniki Metro Line 2
Thessaloniki Urban Transport Organization

Thessaloniki Metro
2023 in rail transport